Gaspard Rinaldi (born 26 May 1909 in Cannes — 24 November 1978 in Marseille) was a French cyclist.

Palmares

1929
2nd Marseille - Nice
1930
Marseille - Nice
Nice - Annot - Nice
Grand Prix de Cannes
1931
Nice
1933
4th stage Tour de Suisse
3rd Tour de Suisse
1935
Tour de Suisse

References

1909 births
1978 deaths
French male cyclists
Tour de Suisse stage winners